Dish México, S. de R. L. de C.V. is a Mexican-owned company that operates a subscription satellite television service in Mexico nationwide. S. de R. L. de C.V. stands for Sociedad de Responsabilidad Limitada de Capital Variable, a form of limited company. It is owned by MVS Comunicaciones (51%) and Dish Network Corporation (49%).

History
On 1 December 2008, Dish México began to operate in Mexico, after an agreement between Dish Network Corporation (a spinoff from former parent company EchoStar, which was founded by Charlie Ergen as a satellite television equipment distributor in 1980) and the Mexican media conglomerate MVS Comunicaciones. Dish Network owns 49% and MVS owns 51% of Dish México. In January 2011, Dish México added six HD channels TNT, Space, Fox Sports en Español, History Channel, Universal Channel and Sony Entertainment Television. In April 2011, Dish México added three new channels: Fox, Nat Geo, and Nat Geo Wild. All of Dish México's channels programming are dubbed or subtitled in Spanish or originally Spanish language.

Broadcast networks
Dish México could not transmit Televisa or TV Azteca network locals due to a dispute between Dish México and Televisa. The fight was produced when Televisa wanted to charge Dish México per subscriber for its feeds of free over-the-air Televisa network channels; including some restricted channel. Dish México decided to distribute an HD receiver with a terrestrial antenna input which when connected to an over the air antenna picks up digital local stations signals free of charge.
On June 16, 2013, Dish showed a TV commercial where they announced that it would add the national free-to-air television channels, including Televisa (Las Estrellas, Canal 5 and Gala TV) and TV Azteca (Azteca 7 and Azteca Trece), thanks to the telecommunications reform enacted in June 2013, in which all satellite TV companies are forced to transmit television signals that have 50 percent coverage national territory or more. The broadcast of these channels was made official since September 11, 2013.

References

External links

 

MVS Comunicaciones
Direct broadcast satellite services
High-definition television